Logic is the study of the principles and criteria of valid inference and demonstration

Logic  may also refer to:

Mathematical logic, a branch of mathematics that grew out of symbolic logic
Philosophical logic, the application of formal logic to philosophical problems

Art, entertainment, and the media
"Logic" (song), by Operator Please, 2010
Logic, a 1981 album by Hideki Matsutake's Logic System
Mr Logic, a character in a Viz magazine comic strip
Logic (poem) by Ringelnatz
The Logic, a Canadian news website

People
Logic (rapper) (born 1990), American rapper
Logic, member of hip hop group Y'all So Stupid
DJ Logic (born 1972), American turntablist
Lamont "Logic" Coleman, producer of two tracks on Jim Jones's 2011 album, Capo
Lora Logic (born 1960), British saxophonist and singer
Louis Logic, American underground hip-hop emcee
Samantha Logic (born 1992), American basketball player

Science and technology
Business logic, program portion encoding the rules determining data processing
Digital logic, a class of digital circuits characterized by the technology underlying its logic gates
LOGIC (electronic cigarette), an electronic cigarette owned by Logic Technology Development
Relocating logic, embedded information in programs for relocation
Logically, a startup known for its software, which utilizes artificial intelligence to label textual or visual media as real or fake.

Software
Dolby Pro Logic, also known as Pro Logic, a surround sound processing technology
Logic Pro, a MIDI sequencer and Digital Audio Workstation application, part of Logic Studio
Logic Studio, a music production suite by Apple Inc.

See also
Logarithm
Logik (disambiguation)
Logistic (disambiguation)
School of Names